Georgia took part in the Junior Eurovision Song Contest 2018 which was held on 25 November 2018 in Minsk, Belarus.

Background

Before Junior Eurovision

Ranina
Georgia used an original children's talent show format for the first time, Ranina (Georgian: რანინა), as the selection method for their artist. Starting on 2 March 2018, the show lasted around two months with ten candidate artists.

Contestants

Round 1 (2 – 9 March 2018) 
The jurors for this round were Davit Evgenidze, Natalia Kutateladze and Beka Gochiashvili.

Round 2 (16 – 23 March 2018) 
The jurors for this round were Liza Bagrationi, Kakha Tolordava and Sophie Villy.

Round 3 (30 March – 13 April 2018) 
The jurors for this round were Buka Kartozia, Nino Katamadze and Zviad Bolkvadze.

Round 4 (20 – 27 April 2018) 
The jurors for this round were Zaza Marjanishvili, Maia Datunashvili and Misha Mdinaradze.

At the end of Show 8, the semi-finalists were announced. The five participants who collected the most points throughout the four tours advanced to the next round. They are Alexandre Zazarashvili, Anastasia Togonidze, Davit Kimeridze, Nikoloz Vasadze, and Tamar Edilashvili.

Semi-final (4 – 11 May 2018) 
The jurors for the first semi-final were Misha Mdinaradze, Sopho Khalvashi and Beka Gochiashvili.

The jurors for the second semi-final were Misha Mdinaradze, Sopho Toroshelidze and Beka Gochiashvili.

Final (18 May 2018) 
The jurors for the Final were Davit Evgenidze, Maia Datunashvili and David Malazonia.

Artist and song information

Tamar Edilashvili
Tamar Edilashvili (born 11 May 2005) is a Georgian child singer. She represented Georgia at the Junior Eurovision Song Contest 2018 in Minsk, Belarus.

The young singer currently studies at the NK School-Lyceum and the E. Mikeladze Central Music School. Tamar is no stranger to music competitions, having participated in the X Factor Georgia in 2017 and reaching the semi-final.

In October of last year, the three-month-long competition Ranina had begun, which saw Tamar and nine other entrants participate in multiple rounds of the show. During one of the shows, Tamar performed with Ethno-Jazz Band Iriao, the group that represented Georgia at this year's Eurovision Song Contest.

At Junior Eurovision
During the opening ceremony and the running order draw which both took place on 19 November 2018, Georgia was drawn to perform thirteenth on 25 November 2018, following Australia and preceding Israel.

Voting

Detailed voting results

References

Junior Eurovision Song Contest
Georgia (country)
2018